Aisi Hai Tanhai is a Pakistani television serial aired on ARY Digital Network on 8 November 2017 and ended on 21 March 2018. It is written by Mohsin Ali, produced by Fahad Mustafa, Dr.Ali Kazmi and directed by Badar Mehmood. In this serial Sami Khan has played a lead role which was based on a love story with Sonya Hussain and Nadia Khan. Aisi Hai Tanhai talks about how social media can become a curse for some one's life and destroy everything.

Plot

Pakeeza Islam (Sonya Hussain) is a college student who lives with her single mother Khadija (Saba Hameed) and older sister Kinza (Nadia Khan). She falls in love with her classmate Hamza (Sami Khan) and soon they are engaged. Meanwhile, Kinza is married into a respectable family. One day, Hamza challenges Pakeeza to prove the love and trust she has for him. She takes revealing pictures on her phone and the next day offers for Hamza to take a look. He feels ashamed and denies the offer. Immediately afterward, goons forcefully steal Pakeeza's phone and shoot her in the process. Hamza rushes her to the hospital, where she recovers fully but expresses concern over the contents of her phone.

The goons leak Pakeeza's photos all over social media, where they go viral. Hamza's friends hold him responsible for this and Hamza goes to lengths to ensure that Pakeeza's family remains oblivious. His close friend Ramsha (Sadia Ghafar) is in love with him and feels jealous of his relationship with Pakeeza. To sabotage their engagement, she forwards Pakeeza's photos to Hamza's mother. This causes Hamza's parents to break off their son's engagement. Pakeeza's family learns the truth about her viral photos when Kinza's husband divorces her. In retaliation, Khadija feeds her poison. As Pakeeza is admitted to the hospital in critical condition, Khadija leaves and informs everyone that Pakeeza committed suicide. This devastates Kinza and Hamza, while Ramsha feels guilty for her sabotage. Pakeeza is shifted to another ward in the meantime, where Dr. Saad (Kamran Jilani) takes interest in her case and takes it upon himself to try and heal her. When Khadija returns to the hospital, she is told that there is a deceased patient in the ward Pakeeza had been in, causing her to believe that Pakeeza is dead.

While she is in a coma, Pakeeza is raped by a hospital custodian and this goes unnoticed by the rest of the staff. She eventually awakens, much to Dr. Saad's delight, and begins to recover slowly. In the meantime, Hamza marries Kinza as he feels responsible for ruining Pakeeza and her family's reputation. Dr. Saad offers Pakeeza shelter in his home after she is discharged and learns that she is pregnant. The hospital custodian is arrested, while Pakeeza is distraught over the trauma she has faced. Dr. Saad begins to receive threats for helping her and to protect him, she leaves to stay in a women's shelter. There she is shunned once it is discovered that she is pregnant. Now homeless, Pakeeza travels to a local shrine and suffers a bad fall. Ramsha, who had been volunteering at the shrine, sees this and is shocked to know that Pakeeza is alive. She takes her to a hospital, where Pakeeza is told that she has had a miscarriage. While Ramsha takes care of Pakeeza at her own home, Dr. Saad works hard to take the custodian to court. He urges Pakeeza to provide testimony so that justice can be served. Khadija receives a notice to appear in court, where she is shocked to find Pakeeza alive. Kinza and Hamza are also surprised to learn of Pakeeza's rape case. During the trial, the prosecutor questions Pakeeza's character and discusses her leaked photos. After Khadija and Ramsha admit their wrongdoings in court, this further traumatizes Pakeeza. She confronts her mother and Hamza, questioning their actions. Khadija passes away the next morning after wallowing in guilt. Soon after this, Hamza is shot and dies in the hospital as Pakeeza weeps beside him. The court finds the custodian guilty after he confesses his crime and is sentenced to jail. Pakeeza forgives Ramsha and moves in with her. She opens up a self-defense school for young girls, promising to fight for their rights.

Cast 
Sonya Hussain as Pakeeza Islam
Sami Khan as Hamza
Nadia Khan as Kinza
Sadia Ghaffar as Ramsha
Saba Hameed as Khadija Islam
Shehryar Zaidi as Hamza's father
Seemi Pasha as Hamza's mother
Kamran Jilani as Dr. Saad
Fazila Qazi as Dr. Saad's sister

Soundtrack

International broadcast
The serial was dubbed in Arabic and was broadcast under the title Karamati (کرامتی) on MBC Bollywood across Arab World and North Africa.

Awards and nominations

References

External links 
 

2017 Pakistani television series debuts
2018 Pakistani television series endings
ARY Digital original programming
Pakistani drama television series
Urdu-language telenovelas
Pakistani television series endings